The 2023 Lucknow Municipal Corporation election is an upcoming election for the members of Lucknow Municipal Corporation which governs Lucknow, the capital and the largest city of the Indian state of Uttar Pradesh. The dates and the schedule are yet to be announced by the SEC and the elections are likely to take place in April 2023.

The date of dissolution of the house is 20 January 2023, there will be again administrator period in the corporation if the SEC will be unable to conduct the general elections by date.

Schedule

Background 
After the 2017 LMC elections, Sanyukta Bhatia of Bharatiya Janata Party who got about 41.94% of total votes cast in the election became the first female mayor of Lucknow with the absolute majority of NDA in the house.

There were 14 candidates who won independently from their wards in 2017 LMC elections.

The delimitation process has been done by SEC after which the number of wards is same as it was earlier, but the several wards has been bifurcated and many of the wards are got merged into single.  The Lucknow Mayoral seat has been given unreserved reservation this time by the commission unlike in the previous elections. There is a delay in conducting elections because of 3 months of stay order from Supreme Court to the decision of Allahabad High Court to have elections without OBC reservation. The elections are now expected to be held by the month of April 2023.

Parties and alliances







Others

See also
2023 elections in India
List of Mayors of Lucknow
Lucknow Municipal Corporation
Lucknow

References 

Lucknow
Lucknow
Lucknow
Government of Lucknow